is a town located in Nemuro Subprefecture, Hokkaido, Japan. As of April 30, 2017, the town has an estimated population of 15,179, and an area of 1,320.15 km2 (the second largest in Hokkaido). The town is primarily agricultural, with numerous dairy farms. It comprises a part of the agricultural region referred to as "Milk Land Hokkaido".

History
1923 - 6 villages combine, forming the village of Betsukai.
1971 - Betsukai Village becomes Betsukai Town.

Climate

Mascot

He is a bull that looks like a cow. He is a fisherman, and a milk farmer. He was unveiled on 30 June 2013.

References

External links

Official Website 

Towns in Hokkaido